Live Oak is an incorporated city in Sutter County, California, United States. It is part of the Yuba City Metropolitan Statistical Area within the Greater Sacramento CSA, and includes a hamlet historically named Stafford. The population was 8,392 at the 2010 census.

Geography

Live Oak is located at  (39.274518, -121.662003).

According to the United States Census Bureau, the city has a total area of 2.5 square miles (4.8 km2), all of it land. Live Oak is an agricultural community located in the fertile Sacramento Valley. Rich farmlands, orchards, the Feather River, and the Sutter Buttes surround Live Oak.

Climate
Live Oak's climate usually consists of hot, dry summers and prolonging wet, cool winters, a Mediterranean climate. Summers are hot, sunny and dry but a delta breeze occurs at times. This cools the temperature but doesn't last long. Heat waves occur during the summer months, lasting for 3–5 days on average. Temperatures range from 105 to 110 degrees. Dry months range from mid to late May to early to mid September where rainfall is rare. The hottest month is July with temperatures averaging around 96 to 100 degrees with no rain but it isn't rare for some rain to arrive from the Southwest Monsoon. Winters are prolonging wet, cool and foggy. Wet months range from mid October to mid April where rainfall becomes constant. January is the wettest and coolest month with rainfall averaging between 4 and 6 inches but during El Niño season, rainfall averages 10 to 12 inches which causes major flooding. During the La Niña season, rainfall averages 4 inches or below, causing drought problems during summer. In the winter, temperatures average 45 to 50 degrees. Foggy and cloudy weather can last up to 2 to 4 weeks, also known as Tule fog. Snow occurs rarely. The record amount of snow was 3.8 inches in 2002.

Demographics

2010
The 2010 United States Census reported that Live Oak had a population of 8,392. The racial makeup of Live Oak was 4,491 (53.5%) White, 138 (1.6%) African American, 130 (1.5%) Native American, 978 (11.7%) Asian, 17 (0.2%) Pacific Islander, 2,173 (25.9%) from other races, and 465 (5.5%) from two or more races. Hispanic or Latino of any race were 4,093 persons (48.8%).

The Census reported that 7,972 people (95.0% of the population) lived in households, 22 (0.3%) lived in non-institutionalized group quarters, and 398 (4.7%) were institutionalized.

There were 2,331 households, out of which 1,161 (49.8%) had children under the age of 18 living in them, 1,402 (60.1%) were opposite-sex married couples living together, 296 (12.7%) had a female householder with no husband present, 147 (6.3%) had a male householder with no wife present.  There were 121 (5.2%) unmarried opposite-sex partnerships, and 13 (0.6%) same-sex married couples or partnerships. 400 households (17.2%) were made up of individuals, and 186 (8.0%) had someone living alone who was 65 years of age or older. The average household size was 3.42.  There were 1,845 families (79.2% of all households); the average family size was 3.88.

The population was spread out, with 2,571 people (30.6%) under the age of 18, 816 people (9.7%) aged 18 to 24, 2,356 people (28.1%) aged 25 to 44, 1,753 people (20.9%) aged 45 to 64, and 896 people (10.7%) who were 65 years of age or older.  The median age was 31.7 years. For every 100 females, there were 89.9 males.  For every 100 females age 18 and over, there were 87.1 males.

The homeowner vacancy rate was 2.6%; the rental vacancy rate was 8.2%.  5,306 people (63.2% of the population) lived in owner-occupied housing units and 2,666 people (31.8%) lived in rental housing units.

2000
As of the census of 2000, there were 6,229 people, 1,729 households, and 1,393 families residing in the city. The racial makeup of the city was 49.67% White, 1.57% African American, 1.89% Native American, 9.63% Asian, 0.06% Pacific Islander, 32.62% from other races, and 4.54% from two or more races. Hispanic or Latino of any race were 48.61% of the population.

There were 1,729 households, out of which 48.8% had children under the age of 18 living with them, 60.7% were married couples living together, 14.3% had a female householder with no husband present, and 19.4% were non-families. 17.0% of all households were made up of individuals, and 8.8% had someone living alone who was 65 years of age or older.  The average household size was 3.43 and the average family size was 3.85.

In the city, the population was spread out, with 33.0% under the age of 18, 9.6% from 18 to 24, 29.5% from 25 to 44, 17.2% from 45 to 64, and 10.7% who were 65 years of age or older.  The median age was 30 years. For every 100 females, there were 91.4 males.  For every 100 females age 18 and over, there were 85.5 males.

The median income for a household in the city was $25,754, and the median income for a family was $31,075. Males had a median income of $22,901 versus $20,852 for females. The per capita income for the city was $9,571.  About 26.0% of families and 30.2% of the population were below the poverty line, including 40.4% of those under age 18 and 7.9% of those age 65 or over.

Education
Live Oak Child Care Center ages 3–5
Live Oak Headstart Preschool
Live Oak Luther Elementary School kindergarten-4
Live Oak Middle School grades 5-8
Live Oak High School grades 9-12
Encinal Elementary School grades K-8
Nuestro Elementary School grades K-8

Government

Emergency services

Fire
Live Oak has a fire dept. which is part of the Sutter County Fire Department.

Law Enforcement
Until the mid-1970s, Live Oak had its own police department.  In the 1970s the city decided to contract out services from the Sutter County Sheriff's Department.

There is a dedicated group of deputies from the Sheriff's Department who are stationed in and patrol mainly in the Live Oak contract area, making for a more effective patrol and more community oriented department.

The city has a substation staffed with seven patrol deputies, a Sergeant and a Lieutenant. The city also has a K9 unit to exclusively patrol the Live Oak area.

EMS
Emergency Medical Services (EMS), including ambulance/paramedics, are covered by the Bi-County Ambulance company, which covers both Sutter and Yuba County areas.

Emergency Services Headquarters
Both the Sheriff's Department Live Oak Sub Station and the Live Oak Fire Department are located at the corner of Fir Street and O Street in Live Oak.

Business
The City's economy relies mainly on agricultural production. Its minimum-security Leo Chesney prison, located on nearly 10 acres a few blocks west of downtown Live Oak, directly abuts residential neighborhoods on its north and east perimeters. It held up to 195 women inmates. It is owned by the CoreCivic corporation, but was operated by Cornell Companies, of Houston, Texas, then after 2010 by Boca Raton, Florida's GEO Group after Cornell's purchase by its larger competitor. It has been vacant since 2011.

See also

 List of cities in California
 List of communities in California

References

External links

 Live Oak on the Yuba-Sutter local wiki

Cities in Sutter County, California
Cities in Sacramento metropolitan area
1947 establishments in California
Populated places established in 1947
Incorporated cities and towns in California